Pennsylvania Route 994 (PA 994) is a Pennsylvania highway which runs for . It runs from PA 26 in Entriken to U.S. Route 522 (US 522) in Orbisonia.

This highway crosses Raystown Lake via a bridge over the lake. Fireworks are held at the Raystown Lake Resort on Memorial Day Weekend, July 3 and the Sunday night before Labor Day. The fireworks at the resort are watched on the lake but they can be seen from the bridge because the resort is just south of the PA 994 bridge which crosses Raystown Lake.

Route description

Traveling east from Entriken, the route travels to the southeast before turning to the north and making a U-turn to parallel the shore of Raystown Lake. PA 994 then crosses the lake twice, once on a small bridge crossing a small "finger" of the lake and the second time on a bridge that is combination of a land bridge and a man-made bridge. Following the second crossing, the route returns to a southeasterly path.

For the next , PA 994 parallels the southern border of the Trough Creek State Park, turning to the south in the progress. The route returns east near State Route 3019 (SR 3019) in Cooks before taking an erratic path eastward due to the terrain up to an intersection with PA 655 south of the borough of Saltillo. After forming a short  concurrency with PA 655, PA 994 continues east to the borough of Three Springs.

In the center of Three Springs, PA 994 intersects the southern terminus of PA 747 and the former southern terminus of PA 829. PA 994 takes the south exit at this intersection, curving to the east outside of town and gradually shifts northeast toward the borough of Orbisonia.

Southwest of Orbisonia, PA 994 intersects the northern terminus PA 475. From this point, PA 994 runs north–south before jutting back to the east in Orbisonia towards its eastern terminus at US 522.

History
Signed in 1928.  In 1932, the route was paved.  In 1936, the route was moved from the PA 915 alignment and SR 4006 to Houstontown to its current location between Entriken to Robertsdale. In spring 1964, the eastern terminus moved from PA 913 north of Robertsdale to its current location.

Major intersections

See also

References

External links

Pennsylvania Highways: PA 994

994
Transportation in Huntingdon County, Pennsylvania